A springbok is an antelope native to southern and western Africa.

Springbok may also refer to:
 The South Africa national rugby union team, known as the Springboks
 Springbok colours, formerly awarded to South African sportsmen and women representing the country in international competitions
 Springbok, Northern Cape, a town in South Africa
 Springbok, Mpumalanga, a populated place in South Africa
 Springbok, the callsign of South African Airways
 The South Africa national cricket team used to be known as the Springboks, but are now referred to as the Proteas
 Springbok (horse), for the American Thoroughbred racehorse who won the 1873 Belmont Stakes
 Springbok (greyhounds), a leading novice hurdle competition in the greyhound racing calendar
 Springbok Radio, a former South African radio station
 Gladiators: Springbok Challenge, a series of specials for the Gladiators television sport franchise
 Springbokkie, is a cocktail shooter that is popular in South Africa
 Springbok Nude Girls, is a rock band from Cape Town, South Africa
 Springbok, a LNER Thompson Class B1 locomotive.

See also
Springbox (disambiguation)